This version of the NWA North American Tag Team Championship was a major tag team championship that was primarily defended in the National Wrestling Alliance affiliated New Japan Pro-Wrestling and NWA Hollywood Wrestling. The title essentially served as New Japan's primary tag team title though it was also occasionally defended and recognized in the Los Angeles area. This title was the second NWA sanctioned title to be named the North American Tag Team Championship and was retired on April 23, 1981 after announcement of the IWGP, a new governing body, which would promote their own-branded championships.

Title history

See also
National Wrestling Alliance
WWF International Tag Team Championship
IWGP Tag Team Championship

Footnotes

References

External links
NWA North American Tag Team Title Histories

National Wrestling Alliance championships
NWA Hollywood Wrestling championships
New Japan Pro-Wrestling championships
Tag team wrestling championships
Professional wrestling in Los Angeles